German submarine U-1020 was a Type VIIC/41 U-boat of Nazi Germany's Kriegsmarine during World War II.

She was ordered on 13 June 1942, and was laid down on 30 April 1943, at Blohm & Voss, Hamburg, as yard number 220. She was launched on 22 March 1944, and commissioned under the command of Oberleutnant zur See Otto Eberlein on 17 May 1944.

Design
German Type VIIC/41 submarines were preceded by the heavier Type VIIC submarines. U-1020 had a displacement of  when at the surface and  while submerged. She had two shafts and two  propellers.

U-1020 was fitted with five  torpedo tubes (four fitted at the bow and one at the stern), fourteen torpedoes or 26 TMA or TMB Naval mines, one  SK C/35 naval gun, 220 rounds, one  Flak M42 and two  C/30 anti-aircraft guns. The boat had a complement of between forty-four and fifty-two.

Service history
U-1020 had a Schnorchel underwater-breathing apparatus fitted out sometime before June 1944.

On 22 November 1944, U-1020 left Horten on her first, and only, war patrol.  Forty-nine days into her patrol, 9 January 1945, U-1020 struck a British mine east of Dundee in the North Sea. All 52 of her crew went down with the boat.

See also
 Battle of the Atlantic

References

Bibliography

External links

German Type VIIC/41 submarines
U-boats commissioned in 1944
World War II submarines of Germany
1944 ships
Ships built in Hamburg
Maritime incidents in January 1945
World War II shipwrecks in the North Sea
U-boats sunk by mines